Bruno Le Roux (born 2 May 1965) was the Minister of the Interior of France from 6 December 2016 to 21 March 2017. He was a member of the National Assembly of France where he represented the Seine-Saint-Denis department and was the leader of the Socialist, Ecologist & Republican Group. He led the Socialist Party in the National Assembly from 2012 until 2016. On 6 December 2016 he was named Minister of the Interior in the Government of Bernard Cazeneuve.

In 2015, news media reported that Le Roux was included in a Russian blacklist of prominent people from the European Union who are not allowed to enter the country.

On 21 March 2017, Le Roux was forced to resign from the government when it was revealed that he employed his two daughters, aged just 15 and 16, as parliamentary assistants – using public funds – while he served as a deputy in the National Assembly. He was succeeded by Matthias Fekl, the Minister of State for Foreign Trade.

References

|-

1965 births
French interior ministers
Living people
People from Gennevilliers
Socialist Party (France) politicians
Deputies of the 12th National Assembly of the French Fifth Republic
Deputies of the 13th National Assembly of the French Fifth Republic
Deputies of the 14th National Assembly of the French Fifth Republic
Mayors of places in Île-de-France
Paris Nanterre University alumni
Academic staff of Sorbonne Paris North University